is a large Aten near-Earth asteroid and potentially hazardous object. It has a well determined orbit with an observation arc of 7 years and an uncertainty parameter of 0. It was discovered on 1 April 2005 by the Siding Spring Survey at an apparent magnitude of 18.1 using the  Uppsala Southern Schmidt Telescope.

Based on an absolute magnitude of 16.4, the asteroid has an estimated diameter of 1.6 km (within a factor of two).  is the largest potentially hazardous asteroid (PHA) discovered in 2005. The 2012 passage was studied with radar using Goldstone and Arecibo.

References

External links 
 
 
 

308242
308242
308242
308242
20120621
20050401